The 2002 Challenge Bell was a tennis tournament played on indoor carpet courts at the Club Avantage Multi-Sports in Quebec City in Canada that was part of Tier III of the 2002 WTA Tour. It was the 10th edition of the Challenge Bell, and was held from September 16 through September 22, 2002. Elena Bovina won the singles title.

Champions

Singles

 Elena Bovina def.  Marie-Gaïané Mikaelian, 6–3, 6–4
It was Bovina's 2nd title of the year and the 2nd of her career.

Doubles

 Samantha Reeves /  Jessica Steck def.  María Emilia Salerni /  Fabiola Zuluaga, 4–6, 6–3, 7–5
It was Reeves' only title of the year and the 2nd of her career. It was Steck's only title of the year and the 1st of her career.

External links
Official website

Challenge Bell
Tournoi de Québec
Challenge Bell
2000s in Quebec City